Radovan Světlík (born 12 April 1974) is a Czech former professional tennis player.

Světlík, who reached a best ranking of 230 in the world, qualified for his only ATP Tour main draw at the 1999 Prague Open. He had qualifying wins over Petr Pála, Radomír Vašek and Tuomas Ketola, then fell to Australian Open semi-finalist Nicolás Lapentti in the first round.

During his career he also featured in the qualifying draws for the French Open, Wimbledon and US Open.

Most of the time he competed on the Challenger and ITF circuits. He won a Challenger tournament at Bressanone in 1999, partnering David Miketa in the doubles.

Challenger titles

Doubles: (1)

References

External links
 
 

1974 births
Living people
Czech male tennis players